Polygala westii is a very rare plant species in the family Polygalaceae. It is endemic to southern Africa.

References

westii